Alby with Thwaite is a civil parish in the English county of Norfolk. The parish straddles the A140 some 10 km south of Cromer and 30 km north of Norwich, including the settlements of Alby and Thwaite.

Alby with Thwaite has an area of 5.81 km2 and in the 2001 census had a population of 223 in 86 households, the population increasing to 245 at the 2011 Census. For the purposes of local government, the parish falls within the district of North Norfolk.

The church of Thwaite, All Saints, is one of 124 existing round-tower churches in Norfolk. Other features of interest are the 1624 pulpit and the 1824 Sunday school room situated north of the chancel.

Toponymy 
The name 'Alby' means 'Ali's farm/settlement'.

The name 'Thwaite' means 'Clearing'.

References

External links

A vision of Alby with Thwaite
Thwaite All Saints on the European Round Tower Churches website

Civil parishes in Norfolk
North Norfolk